The Petre Baronetcy, of Cranham Hall in the County of Essex, was a title in the Baronetage of England. It was created in circa 1642 for Francis Petre. The third Baronet was a Jesuit and close adviser to King James II. The title became extinct on the death of the fifth Baronet in 1722.

The Petre Baronets were members of a junior branch of the family headed by the Baron Petre.

Petre baronets, of Cranham Hall
Sir Francis Petre, 1st Baronet (–)
Sir Francis Petre, 2nd Baronet (–)
Sir Edward Petre, 3rd Baronet (–1699)
Sir Thomas Petre, 4th Baronet (1640–)
Sir William Petre, 5th Baronet (1650–1722)

References

Extinct baronetcies in the Baronetage of England